Alexandre Egea (born 6 June 1990), commonly known as Alê, is a Brazilian footballer who plays as a defensive midfielder for América Mineiro.

Club career
Born in Osasco, São Paulo, Alê represented Corinthians and Primeira Camisa as a youth. He made his senior debut with the latter's first team on 1 May 2010, starting in a 5–2 Campeonato Paulista Segunda Divisão home routing of Joseense.

Alê scored his first senior goal on 10 July 2010, netting the last of a 3–0 home success over União Suzano. On 15 December, he signed for Inter de Limeira on loan for the ensuing Campeonato Paulista Série A3, but was released the following 14 February after playing only one match.

On 2 September 2011, after returning to his parent club, Alê moved to Taubaté for the Copa Paulista, but featured sparingly. In 2012 he signed for Osasco, being an important unit for the side before moving to neighbouring Grêmio Osasco.

In December 2013, after a short loan period at Série C side Grêmio Barueri, Alê was announced in the squad of Grêmio Osasco's affiliate club Audax Rio. After featuring rarely, he was released, and joined Uberlândia for the 2015 campaign.

After helping Uberlândia win the Campeonato Mineiro Módulo II, Alê served temporary deals at Coimbra, URT, Caldense and Cuiabá. Back to the club for the 2018 season, he impressed during the year's Campeonato Mineiro, and returned to Cuiabá on 20 April 2018, now in a permanent deal.

During his first season, Alê was a regular starter as his side achieved promotion to Série B. In his second, he remained a starter as his side lifted the Campeonato Matogrossense and the Copa Verde.

On 10 December 2019, Alê agreed to a one-year contract with América Mineiro, still in the second division.

Career statistics

Honours
Uberlândia
Campeonato Mineiro Módulo II: 2015

Cuiabá
Copa Verde: 2019
Campeonato Matogrossense: 2019

References

External links

1990 births
Living people
People from Osasco
Footballers from São Paulo (state)
Brazilian footballers
Association football midfielders
Campeonato Brasileiro Série A players
Campeonato Brasileiro Série B players
Campeonato Brasileiro Série C players
Campeonato Brasileiro Série D players
Associação Atlética Internacional (Limeira) players
Esporte Clube Taubaté players
Osasco Futebol Clube players
Grêmio Esportivo Osasco players
Grêmio Barueri Futebol players
Audax Rio de Janeiro Esporte Clube players
Uberlândia Esporte Clube players
Coimbra Esporte Clube players
União Recreativa dos Trabalhadores players
Associação Atlética Caldense players
Cuiabá Esporte Clube players
América Futebol Clube (MG) players